Great Rail Journeys, based in York, United Kingdom, is a tour operator that offers escorted worldwide rail tour holidays. The company is Association of British Travel Agents (ABTA) and Air Travel Organisers' Licensing (ATOL)-bonded and is a member of the Association of Independent Tour Operators (AITO).

History

Previous owner, ECI Partners, sold its stake in Great Rail Journeys ('GRJ') in July 2018. Duke Street, the UK based mid-market private equity firm, acquired Great Rail Journeys (‘GRJ’) on 2 July 2018, the world’s leading provider of escorted rail holidays, from ECI. The terms of the transaction were not disclosed. 

In 2018, Great Rail Journeys acquired Vacations By Rail and labelling their journeys in the USA under Vacations By Rail, while shutting down their headquarters in New York and moving their operations to Chicago.

References

External links
 
 The Times - To Rome By Rail

Travel and holiday companies of the United Kingdom
Tourism in the United Kingdom
Railtour operators of the United Kingdom